Julian Glover,  is an English journalist and speechwriter who is Associate Editor of the London Evening Standard. He previously served as a special adviser in the Department for Transport. Previously he was the chief speechwriter to the former prime minister, David Cameron. Glover wrote for The Guardian from 2001 to 2011 as a leader writer and columnist.

On 7 October 2011, it was announced that he had been appointed as the chief speechwriter to Prime Minister David Cameron.

He has been the civil partner of Times columnist and former Conservative MP Matthew Parris since 2006.

He chaired a review of English National Parks and Areas of Outstanding Natural Beauty which produced a report in September 2019, titled Landscapes Review and also known as the Designated Landscapes Review and the Glover Review. The Guardian summarised the report as "National parks and areas of outstanding natural beauty have not done enough to protect nature or welcome diverse visitors, and extra government funding must help drive radical change".  The Conservative Party's manifesto for the 2019 United Kingdom general election included the words "We welcome the Glover Review and will create new National Parks and Areas of Outstanding Natural Beauty, as well as making our most loved landscapes greener, happier, healthier and open to all."

References

Living people
English LGBT writers
Speechwriters
The Guardian journalists
British LGBT journalists
British special advisers
Conservative Party (UK) officials
Officers of the Order of the British Empire
Year of birth missing (living people)
British gay writers